The Victoria Aces are an Australian baseball team who compete in the Claxton Shield Baseball Championship. One of the founding teams of the Claxton Shield in 1934, they competed until 1988. Thereafter the Claxton Shield was awarded to the winner of the Australian Baseball League until 2002.  In 1999 the Victoria Aces accepted an invitation to join the International Baseball League of Australia. They competed in the League for two seasons (1999–2000 and 2002); after this point the Claxton Shield reverted to a competition similar to 1988.

Baseball Victoria (BV) selects the Victoria Aces team to compete in the Claxton Shield. BV also governs all levels of baseball in the state of Victoria, and directly runs the State League, which is the top level of competition in the state and the source of the majority of Australian-based players selected for the Victoria Aces.

History

2009 Claxton Shield roster
Victoria Ace's 19-man roster for 2009 Claxton Shield, announced by Baseball Victoria,
consisted of:

2010 Claxton Shield roster

References 

Claxton Shield
Baseball teams in Australia
Baseball in Victoria (Australia)
Aces
Baseball teams established in 1934
1934 establishments in Australia